Fremantle Fire Station, in Phillimore Street, Fremantle, Western Australia, was the second fire station built for the Fremantle Fire Brigade and was opened in 1909. It was designed by architectural firm Cavanagh and Cavanagh and constructed by J. Lake. The fire station was designed to house four horse-drawn vehicles, including the district's ambulance, which was also operated by the fire brigade. During World War II the building was taken over by the US military for use as Marine quarters.

In the early 1970s the accommodation at the fire station was inadequate and the Fire Brigade Board wanted to demolish the building, to allow the building of a larger station suitable for vehicles. This proposal was met with opposition from The Fremantle Society and the Fremantle Council. In 1975 the Fire Brigade built a new building on railway land next door, and in 1977 the old building vested in the City of Fremantle.

The building is listed on the Register of the National Estate.

Notes

References

Fire stations completed in 1909
Fremantle West End Heritage area
Phillimore Street, Fremantle
Defunct fire stations in Western Australia
1909 establishments in Australia
State Register of Heritage Places in the City of Fremantle